John George Barrett (17 December 1858 – 19 May 1928) was an Australian politician, a senator in the federal Australian parliament.

Born in Carlton, Barrett was educated there at St Mary's Anglican School before becoming apprenticed as a tinsmith. He was founder and President of the Tinsmith's Society, and also served as President of the Melbourne Trades Hall Council. In 1895, he was elected to the Victorian Legislative Assembly as the member for Carlton South, 
where he remained until 1897. In 1901, he was elected to the Australian Senate as a Labor Senator from Victoria, although he was also endorsed by the Protectionist Party. He was one of only three Labor members elected to the first Parliament from Victoria (the other two were members of the House of Representatives, Frank Tudor and James Ronald). He was defeated in 1903, but continued to be active in the union movement; he was also an active prohibitionist. Barrett died in 1928.

References

Australian Labor Party members of the Parliament of Australia
Members of the Australian Senate for Victoria
Members of the Australian Senate
Members of the Victorian Legislative Assembly
1858 births
1928 deaths
20th-century Australian politicians
19th-century Australian politicians
People from Carlton, Victoria
Politicians from Melbourne